Dominican Convent High School (informally referred to as Convent or DC) is a Catholic, independent, day school for girls in Bulawayo, Zimbabwe. The school was founded by the Dominican Order in 1956.

Dominican Convent High School is a member of the Association of Trust Schools (ATS) and the Headmistress is a member of the Conference of Heads of Independent Schools in Zimbabwe (CHISZ).

See also
 List of schools in Zimbabwe

References

External links
  Official website
  on the ATS website
 

Private schools in Zimbabwe
Cambridge schools in Zimbabwe
Girls' schools in Zimbabwe
Girls' high schools in Zimbabwe
Day schools in Zimbabwe
High schools in Zimbabwe
Catholic secondary schools in Zimbabwe
Dominican schools in Zimbabwe
Educational institutions established in 1956
1956 establishments in the Federation of Rhodesia and Nyasaland
Member schools of the Association of Trust Schools
Education in Bulawayo